Lights of Old Santa Fe is a 1944 American Western Musical film directed by Frank McDonald with a screenplay by Gordon Kahn and Bob Williams. The film stars Roy Rogers and Dale Evans in a story about a rodeo owner and her struggle to make her show a success. When her rodeo is sabotaged by a rival showman, Rogers brings the perpetrator to justice.

Cast
 Roy Rogers as Roy Rogers, a western singer and rodeo man
 Dale Evans as Margie Brooks, the owner of Brooks International Rodeo
 George “Gabby” Hayes as Gabby Whittaker, manager of Margie's rodeo
 Tom Keene as Frank Madden, the owner of Madden Worldwide Shows, a rodeo
 Roy Barcroft as Ken Ferguson, Madden's henchman
 Arthur Loft as Bill Wetherbee, a rodeo promoter
 Claire Du Brey as Rosie McGurk, Margie's companion and housekeeper
 Lloyd Corrigan as Marty Maizely, a radio station owner
 Sam Flint as Sheriff
 Lucien Littlefield as the Judge
 Bob Nolan as Bob, a singer and rodeo man
 Sons of the Pioneers as musicians and rodeo men

Soundtrack
 Amor
Written by Ricardo López Méndez, Gabriel Ruiz and Sunny Skylar
Performed by Dale Evans

 The Cowpoke Polka
Written by Tim Spencer
Performed by Roy Rogers, George 'Gabby' Hayes and the Sons of the Pioneers

 I'm A Happy Guy In My Levi Britches
Written by Tim Spencer
Performed by Roy Rogers and the Sons of the Pioneers

 Cowboy Jubilee
Written by Ken Carson 
Performed by Roy Rogers and the Sons of the Pioneers

 The Nerve Of Some People
Written by Jack Elliott 
Performed by Roy Rogers and Dale Evans

 Trigger Hasn't Got A Purty Figure
Written by Tim Spencer 
Performed by Roy Rogers

 Lights of Old Santa Fe
Written by Jack Elliott 
Performed by Roy Rogers, Dale Evans, George 'Gabby' Hayes and the Sons of the Pioneers

 Ride 'Em, Cowboy
Written by Tim Spencer and Roy Rogers
Performed by the Sons of the Pioneers

External links
 
 
 
 

1944 films
1940s Western (genre) musical films
American Western (genre) musical films
American black-and-white films
Republic Pictures films
Films directed by Frank McDonald
1940s English-language films
1940s American films